Çeşməli (also, Çeşməlı, Cheshmali, and Chirkinli) is a village and municipality in the Tovuz Rayon of Azerbaijan.  It has a population of 849.  The municipality consists of the villages of Çeşməli and Abbasqulular.

References 

Populated places in Tovuz District